Gómez Suárez de Figueroa y Córdoba, 1st Duke of Feria (1520?–1571) was a Spanish nobleman and diplomat, and close advisor of Philip II's. 

Probably born in Zafra, Extremadura, he was the second son of Lorenzo Suárez de Figueroa, 3rd Count of Feria, and his wife, Catalina Fernandez de Córdoba, Marchioness of Priego. 

In 1551, he became 5th Count of Feria upon the death of his elder brother Pedro, and in 1554, he travelled with Philip of Spain to England for the king's marriage to Queen Mary I. He served as Captain of the King's Guard, and was regarded as only second to Ruy Gómez in the king's confidence. He went on to fight against the rebellion in the Low Countries, at the Battle of St Quentin. 

After Elizabeth I's accession, he served as Philip's ambassador until he was succeeded by Bishop Álvaro de la Quadra, in May 1559. 

On 29 December 1558, Feria married Mary I's former maid-of-honour, Lady Jane Dormer, a match resisted by both their families. Feria and his wife maintained a strong interest in the protection of English Catholic exiles; the former ambassador also supported the Ridolfi Plot of 1571. In 1567, Philip II created the count 1st Duke of Feria. 

Feria returned to Spain where he served the King as royal chamberlain. 

After Feria's death, he was buried in Zafra, in the Convent of Santa Clara.
He was succeeded by his elder and only surviving son, Lorenzo Suárez de Figueroa y Córdoba, who served as ambassador to the Low Countries and viceroy of Naples. Feria's younger son, Don Gomez, who served as governor of Milan, predeceased his father.

References
 Loades, David (2008): "Suárez de Figueroa, Gómez, first duke of Feria in the Spanish nobility (1520?–1571)". Oxford Dictionary of National Biography. Oxford University Press. online edn. Oct 2008. Retrieved 11 May 2010. (subscription required)
 A Patron and a Playwright in Renaissance Spain: The House of Feria and Diego ... by Ann E. Wiltrout

People of the Tudor period
101
16th-century Spanish people
1520s births
1571 deaths
Ambassadors of Spain to England